Carapano (Karapanã, Carapana-tapuya, Möxdöá) is a Tucanoan language of Colombia and Brazil.

Phonology
Carapano has 11 consonants, plus 3 tones: high, medium and low. 

 

It also has 6 vowels and their nasalized forms.

References

Languages of Colombia
Tucanoan languages